China Petroleum & Chemical Corporation (中国石油化工股份有限公司) or Sinopec, is a Chinese oil and gas enterprise based in Beijing. It is listed in Hong Kong and also trades in Shanghai.

Sinopec Limited's parent, Sinopec Group, is the world's largest oil refining, gas and petrochemical conglomerate, headquartered in Chaoyang District, Beijing. Sinopec's business includes oil and gas exploration, refining, and marketing; production and sales of petrochemicals, chemical fibers, chemical fertilizers, and other chemical products; storage and pipeline transportation of crude oil and natural gas; import, export and import/export agency business of crude oil, natural gas, refined oil products, petrochemicals, and other chemicals. It also produces ethanol and several biofuels such as biodiesel and green jet fuel, from waste vegetable oil.

Corporate history
Sinopec Limited was established as a joint stock entity under the China Petrochemical Corporation Group (Sinopec Group) in February 2000.  The company was simultaneously listed in Hong Kong, New York, and London in October 2000.  A Shanghai listing was completed in June 2001.

Given its legacy asset base from Sinopec Group, analysts have categorized it as a more downstream oil player than PetroChina. Sinopec is the largest oil refiner in Asia by annual volume processed.   Sinopec produces around 1/4 as much raw crude oil as PetroChina, but produces 60% more refined products per annum.

In December 2006, Sinopec acquired the assets of Shengli Petroleum, whose main asset was a maturing domestic oil field, in order to stabilize its crude inputs and raise the utilization rate of its existing refineries.

In March 2013, China Petroleum and Chemical Corp agreed to pay $1.5 billion for Sinopec Group's overseas oil and gas-producing assets.

In August 2013, Sinopec acquired a 33% stake in Apache Corporation’s oil and gas business in Egypt for $3.1 billion.

In December 2013, MCC Holding Hong Kong Corp. Ltd. and MCC Oil & Gas Hong Kong Corp. Ltd., acquired an 18% stake of Sinopec in oil and gas business for $9.3 billion.

Africa

Sinopec signed an evaluation deal with Gabon in 2004. During his African visit that year Chinese President Hu Jintao signed a series of bilateral trade accords with his Gabonese counterpart Omar Bongo, including a "memorandum of agreement aimed at showing the parties' desire to develop exploration, exploitation, refining and export activities of oil products". Three onshore fields were to be explored.

In November 2005, Sinopec Group announced plans to partner with CNPC to purchase an oil field in Sudan, and has reportedly indicated an interest in expanding its business in Sudan.  Sinopec Corporation is a partner in Petrodar Operating Company Ltd., a consortium whose partners also include China National Petroleum Corporation (CNPC, the 90 per cent owner of PetroChina) and Sudapet (the Sudanese state-owned oil company), among others. In August 2005, Petrodar commenced production of oil in blocks 3 and 7 in South-east Sudan. In December 2005, Petrodar announced that its first shipment of crude oil would be shipped from Sudan in January 2006. Petrodar's operations represent a major increase in overall Sudanese oil production. Sinopec is also looking into other companies such as ERHC Energy which has multiple oil block assets in the Joint Development Zone.

In 2007, in eastern Ethiopia’s Ogaden Desert, a raid by an ethnic Somali rebel group on a Sinopec drilling site left 74 dead including 9 Chinese oil workers, and 7 kidnapped on 24 April 2007. The rebels, the Ogaden National Liberation Front (ONLF), later released the seven abductees and warned foreign companies against working in the area. Sinopec said it had no plans to pull out of the resource-rich region despite the attack. Chinese Foreign Ministry spokesperson Liu Jianchao says that China strongly condemns the violent attack carried out by Somalian insurgents on the premises of the oil company Sinopec in Ethiopia.

In August 2009, Sinopec completed a takeover of Geneva-based Addax Petroleum for $7.5 billion marking China's biggest foreign takeover. On 31 October 2011 Addax acquired Shell's 80% share of an exploration firm called Pecten that explores and drills in various offshore locations including the oil basin near Douala, Cameroon in cooperation with TotalEnergies.

In June 2013, Sinopec agreed to acquire Marathon Oil Corp's Angolan offshore oil and gas field for $1.52 billion.

Rest of the world

Aramco, Exxon and Sinopec also signed contracts for a fuel marketing venture that will manage 750 service stations and a network of terminals in Fujian province. Unipec, a subsidiary of Sinopec, signed a contract with French oil company Total Gabon in February 2002. Under the contract China, for the first time, bought Gabonese crude oil. In the African nation of Gabon, Sinopec's joint ventures in oil exploration have been accused of violating environmental conventions by the government of Gabon. Its activities in Gabon's national parks were suspended in September 2006, by the Gabonese national parks council.

On 13 April 2010 the company announced acquisition of Conoco Phillips's 9% stake in the Canadian oil sand firms, Syncrude, for $4.65bn. The deal was granted regulatory approval from the Canadian government on 25 June 2010. While largely welcomed by industry, Sinopec's Syncrude stake has raised concerns about the influence the Chinese government may try to exert on Canadian policy makers.

In October 2011, the company offered C$2.2 billion ($2.1 billion) to acquire Canadian oil and gas firm Daylight Energy. Daylight was renamed Sinopec Daylight Energy Ltd. after it was taken over in December 2011.

On 11 November 2011 Sinopec announced that the company will invest $5.2 billion in buying a 30 percent stake in the Brazilian unit of Galp Energia SGPS SA which discovered biggest reserved in the western hemisphere since 1976.

On 15 October 2012 Sinopec completed the purchase of 20 oil wells belonging to TOTAL E&P in Southern Nigeria in a deal worth around $2.45 billion. This was a remarkable achievement in the company's aim at fully exploring the oil-rich African country. Also they are presently executing an oil/gas project in STUBB CREEK region in Akwa Ibom Southern Nigeria that is capable of producing about 10,000 barrels of oil/day. This is in addition to other exploration projects currently being embarked upon both in Rivers and Akwa Ibom States. Sinopec indeed had previously taken over Addax Petroleum with numerous assets in Nigeria and Cameroon.

On 17 December 2012 Talisman Energy UK announced Sinopec has invested $1.5 billion in a 49 percent stake of Talisman's North Sea properties.

In April 2013, Sinopec agreed to sell a stake of 30 percent in an oil and gas block in Myanmar to Taiwan's CPC Corp.

In November 2021, U.S. producer Venture Global LNG signed a twenty-year contract with Sinopec to supply liquefied natural gas (LNG). In January 2022 they offered to re-sell LNG to take advantage of high Asian spot prices.

China's imports of U.S. natural gas will more than double. In March 2022, a memorandum of understanding was signed between Sinopec and Aramco to strengthen the already existing ties between the companies and to improve their downstream operations.

Unipec, a subsidiary of Sinopec, is an intermediary for banned Russian oil.

Environmental and safety record
In 2004, Sinopec prospected for oil in the 1,550 square kilometers of Loango National Park in southern Gabon and encountered criticism for what domestic and foreign environmental critics said were poor and damaging methods. Primatology professor Christophe Boesch of the US-based environmental organization, the Wildlife Conservation Society (WCS), criticized the use of dynamite and heavy machinery in exploration and road construction by Sinopec through park, noting that it might drive native gorillas deeper into the jungle, where they would be outside legal restrictions on hunting. Gabonese law states that industries can extract oil from national parks, but must rehabilitate them to the prior condition.  Boesch, and other international experts, have suggested that Sinopec use other methods such as horizontal drilling to minimize its environmental footprint. Sinopec's activities in Gabon's national parks were suspended in September 2006, by the Gabonese national parks council.  In 2007, Sinopec redid its earlier environmental study, this time in conjunction with the Gabonese environmentalist group Enviropass and the World Wildlife Foundation, winning high marks from Gabonese, Western, and Chinese conservation experts.  Shortly thereafter, Sinopec resumed production with more environmentally friendly methods.

On 21 December 2006, gas started leaking during the drilling of a test well by the Sinopec Southern Prospecting and Development Branch in Quingxi. 12,380 people were evacuated after the leakage occurred. It took at least three attempts and two weeks for the company to seal the leak.

China's top environmental watchdog warned Sinopec in 2007 to stop operations at one of its oil fields due to chronic river pollution. Zhongyuan Oilfields Petrochemical Company, a unit of Sinopec, had failed to meet waste water treatment requirements and had been ordered to pay a pollution fine and operations had to be halted, according to the State Environmental Protection Administration (SEPA).

Guangdong Provincial Environment Bureau (GPEB)  had also issued a red sign warning to 19 companies, including Sinopec Guangzhou, in February 2008.  By GPEB's standard, the companies that have involved in excessive emissions or caused serious environmental pollution accidents will be given the red sign warning and will be placed under strict supervision.

On Wednesday, 28 July 2010, an explosion at an abandoned Sinopec plastics and chemicals factory in the Qixia District of Nanjing, China killed at least 12 people and seriously injured 15 more.

An oil pipeline explosion on Friday, 22 November 2013, in Qingdao, Shandong province killed at least 62 people, injuring 136, and displacing hundreds more after oil previously leaking onto a street during the day ignited.

Renewable Energies 
In November 2021, construction of a green hydrogen plant in Kuqa city began. The cost of the construction is to amount to 3 billion yuan (US$470 million), and the plant will provide an annual production of 20,000 tons which will be supplied to Sinopec's Tahe refinery and production is to begin by June 2023. Also included in the plans are a storage tank as well as a pipeline network. The project will also be powered by a 1000-megawatt solar power station.

December 2022 a Project for the annual green hydrogen production, for the cost of 20.5 billion yuan ($2.9 billion), in Ulanqab in central Inner Mongolia, targeting  of 100,000 tons of production per year, was confirmed by the Inner Mongolia energy bureau.

Electricity supply will derive from a wind farm of 1.7 gigawatts (GW) and a solar farm of 804 megawatts (MW). The idea is using a pipeline transferring the hydrogen to Sinopec’s Beijing Yanshan petrochemical complex. Construction on the Ulanqab project is slated to start construction in December 2023, with completion scheduled for June 2027.

The other proposal approved last week by inner Mongolia is a 3-billion-yuan ($430 million) project to be sited in the Uxin region of Ordos city.

In Ordos city, inner Mongolia, 430Mio $ are be invested in a 400MW windfarm, for the production of 20,000 tons of green hydrogen per year. The first phase of construction started by the end of 2022.

Scandals 
The former head of the companies board of directors Chen Tonghai was sentenced to death in July 2009 after beeing accused of corruption. He was relieved of post in 2007.

Awards
25th Forbes Global 2000 (2017)

See also

 Chemical industry in China

References

External links
 

Company website 
Company website  

 
Companies listed on the Shanghai Stock Exchange
Companies in the CSI 100 Index
Companies listed on the Hong Kong Stock Exchange
Companies listed on the London Stock Exchange
Companies formerly listed on the New York Stock Exchange
Oil companies of China
Government-owned companies of China
Ch
Chinese brands
Companies in the Hang Seng Index
H shares
Chinese companies established in 2000
Multinational companies headquartered in China
Chaoyang District, Beijing